Ayaka Saito (born 26 August 1991) is a Japanese professional footballer who plays as a goalkeeper for WE League club MyNavi Sendai.

Club career 
Saito made her WE League debut on 17 October 2021.

References 

Japanese women's footballers
Living people
1991 births
Women's association football goalkeepers
Mynavi Vegalta Sendai Ladies players
WE League players
Association football people from Chiba Prefecture